The Oakland Invaders were a professional American football team that played in the United States Football League (USFL) from 1983 through 1985.  Based in Oakland, California, they played at the Oakland–Alameda County Coliseum.

The team can trace its history to 1977 when they played in the California Football League as the Twin Cities Cougars, and won four league championships (1979–1982). During that time, they played their home games at the Marysville High School field.

History

In reaction to the Raiders relocating to Los Angeles
Oakland had been without a football team since the Oakland Raiders relocated to Los Angeles before the 1982 NFL season. The Invaders stepped in to fill the void; the similar name was no accident. One of the Invaders' first player signings was former Raider and 49er Cedrick Hardman, who came out of a one-year retirement to serve as player-coach.

The team was originally owned by Bay Area real estate magnates Jim Joseph and Tad Taube. However, after the original owner of the USFL's Los Angeles franchise, Alex Spanos, bought the San Diego Chargers instead, Joseph and Taube flipped a coin to decide who would buy the Los Angeles rights. Joseph won the toss, selling his stake in the Invaders to Taube. As it turned out, Joseph was forced to move his team to Phoenix, Arizona as the Arizona Wranglers.

1983 season
Taube held fast to David Dixon's original blueprint for the USFL, heavily marketing the team in the Bay Area while keeping tight controls on spending (including player salaries).

Led by the league's 2nd ranked passer QB Fred Besana, WR Gordon Banks, and ex-Raiders HB Arthur Whittington and TE Raymond Chester, the Invaders finished with 9-9 record. However, in an extremely weak Pacific Division, this was enough to garner them the division title. In the playoffs, despite a valiant effort, they were overrun by the eventual league champion Michigan Panthers, 37-21 in front of 60,237 rabid fans in the Pontiac Silverdome (the largest crowd for any USFL game in the 1983 season).

1983 schedule and results

Sources

1984 season
The Invaders were picked by most to again challenge for a playoff spot in 1984, but their powerful offense fell apart in the first half of the season, scoring only 82 points.  The team was unable to run the ball and lost nine straight to open the season. With the emergence of RB Eric Jordan, the Invaders′ running attack rebounded and the team won seven of its last nine games.  The defense was strong throughout the season, finishing seventh in points allowed.  However, attendance tumbled to 23,644 per game – nearly 8,000 fewer than in 1983.

1984 schedule and results

Sources

1985 season
As early as 1984, Taube had come to believe the USFL should move to the fall. He began looking for new investors when it became apparent that the USFL was going to vote to switch to fall play in 1986, knowing he would be competing directly with the San Francisco 49ers. However, unlike other USFL teams who would be going head-to-head against NFL teams, Taube had reason for optimism. The Raiders had successfully built their own niche market and fan base in Oakland for two decades, and there was at least a chance the Invaders could have survived in the same manner.  He nearly merged his team with the Oklahoma Outlaws.  However, talks collapsed when Outlaws owner William Tatham demanded that his son, Bill Jr., be given control over the merged team's football operations.

Taube then approached the Michigan Panthers, who had been one of the league's strongest teams during its first two years. Some observers reckoned them as an NFL-quality team; indeed, the Panthers had made a better account of themselves on the field than the Detroit Lions.  However, Panthers owner A. Alfred Taubman was a strong supporter of spring football, and had no desire to directly compete with the Lions. Knowing that he would not even begin to be able to go head-to-head with the Lions even if he'd been inclined to do so, he had begun putting out feelers for a merger partner when it became clear that the move to the fall was a foregone conclusion. 

Taubman and Taube and quickly reached a deal for a merger. The Invaders would be the surviving team, but Taube sold controlling interest in the merged team to Taubman while remaining chairman of the board.  The merger was formally announced after the owners approved moving to the fall.

The new team, bolstered with key players from the Panthers such as Bobby Hebert, went a league-best 13-4-1 in the regular season and advanced all the way to the 1985 USFL championship game.  The championship game was a rematch of sorts with Chuck Fusina's Stars, who now played in Baltimore; the Panthers had upended the Stars in the league's inaugural title game. The Invaders were in the midst of a potential game-winning drive when a personal-foul penalty derailed their momentum, allowing the Stars to defeat Hebert's Invaders 28-24, and claim indisputable bragging rights as the league's all-time best team.

Despite reaching the championship game, the team's attendance fell again, to a barely sustainable 17,509. Soon after the championship game, Taubman decided to pull out. The loss of Taubman's wealth left the Invaders without nearly enough resources for the move to the fall, and they suspended operations for the 1986 season.  As it turned out, the championship game was the last USFL game ever played, as the league was effectively killed by an antitrust suit against the NFL in which it only won $3 in damages.

1985 schedule and results

Sources

Past and future National Football League players
Albert Bentley
Ray Bentley
Dave Browning 
Anthony Carter
Raymond Chester
Cedrick Hardman
Derek Holloway
Bobby Hebert
Alva Liles
Dewey McClain
Dale Markham
Ray Pinney
Gary Plummer
Mike Shumann
Angelo Snipes
Randy Van Divier
Arthur Whittington

Invaders executive William Hambrecht later emerged as a founder of the United Football League.

Single-season leaders
Rushing Yards: 1,045 (1983), Arthur Whittington

Receiving Yards: 1,323 (1985), Anthony Carter

Passing Yards: 3,980 (1983), Fred Besana

Season-by-season 

|-
|1983 || 9 || 9 || 0 || 1st Pacific || Lost Divisional (Michigan)
|-
|1984 || 7 || 11 || 0 || 4th WC Pacific || 
|-
|1985 || 13 || 4 || 1 || 1st WC || Won Quarterfinal (Tampa Bay)Won Semifinal (Memphis)Lost USFL Championship (Baltimore)
|-
!Totals || 31 || 26 || 1
|colspan="2"| (including playoffs)

References

External links
 USFL.info - Oakland Invaders
 https://web.archive.org/web/20050315221943/http://www.remembertheusfl.8m.com/teams/oakland.html

 
1982 establishments in California
1985 establishments in California